Shahabaz Saleel (born 31 May 1990) is an Indian footballer who plays for All India Sevens side Fifa Manjeri. Prior to now he played for Indian Football clubs Viva Kerala FC a first time and ONGC. He is known for his crossing ability, and his work ethic leadership.

Club career

Early career
Saleel started his career at Tata Football Academy which is India's best footballing academy. He did not manage to graduate Tata but still went on to sign for Viva Kerala FC in 2007.

ONGC
While Saleel was at ONGC F.C. whom he signed for in 2008 he made a name for himself as well as establishing himself as one of the best young defenders in India. Although he only managed four games at ONGC FC it was Saleel's performance in the reserves that caught the eye of people.

Chirag United Kerala
On 21 July 2011 Saleel reportedly signed with Kerala club Chirag United Club Kerala for the second time in his career. He scored his first goal for the club on 24 November 2011 against Pailan Arrows on the I-League.

Quartz Soccer Club
On 26 September 2012, it was announced that Sabas Saleel had signed for Quartz S.C. for the 2012 I-League 2nd Division.

International
After a great season for Saleel with ONGC FC in the I-League he was selected for the Indian U-23 football team which was to play two 2012 Olympic qualifiers against Qatar. He however did not feature in either match.

Stats
Games, Goals, and Assists are correct as of 5 May 2012

References

1990 births
Living people
Footballers from Kerala
Chirag United Club Kerala players
ONGC FC players
Association football defenders
Indian footballers